Precision mechanics (also "fine mechanics") is an engineering discipline that deals with the design and construction of smaller precision machines, often including measuring and control mechanisms of different kinds.

The study may be further defined as the practices of rigid body kinematics to the positioning and holding of objects on the micrometre scale and smaller.

See also
 List of engineering branches

Engineering disciplines